Miller & Martin PLLC is a midsize Southeastern law firm with offices in Atlanta, Georgia, Chattanooga, Tennessee, Nashville, Tennessee, and Charlotte, North Carolina.  The firm employs over 130 attorneys and a similar number of support staff.

Miller & Martin's practice was founded in 1867 in Chattanooga, Tennessee.  Many of its early clients, such as the original bottler of Coca-Cola, have evolved from local concerns into global enterprises.  Miller & Martin is a member of the World Law Group — an international network of independent law firms.

References

External links
Miller & Martin PLLC

Companies based in Chattanooga, Tennessee
Law firms established in 1867
Law firms based in Tennessee